Wyvill Richard Nicolls Raynsford (born 28 January 1945), known as Nick Raynsford, is a British politician who served as a government minister from 1997 to 2005. A member of the Labour Party, he was Member of Parliament (MP) for Greenwich and Woolwich, formerly Greenwich, from 1992 to 2015, having previously been MP for Fulham from 1986 to 1987.

Raised in Northamptonshire, Raynsford was educated at Repton School. He studied History at Sidney Sussex College, Cambridge, where he was involved in opposing the Vietnam War. After serving as a councillor in Hammersmith and Fulham and director of the Shelter Housing Aid Centre, he was elected at a 1986 by-election and served as an MP for a year until losing his seat at the subsequent general election. 

Raynsford returned to Parliament at the 1992 general election and joined the government under the premiership of Tony Blair; his roles included Minister of State for Housing and Planning, Minister for London and Minister of State for Local and Regional Government. He stood down from the House of Commons prior to the 2015 general election, after which he went into the public sector advising on planning and construction.

Early life and career

The son of Wyvill Raynsford and Patricia Raynsford (née Dunn), Raynsford was brought up at Milton Manor in Milton Malsor, Northamptonshire. He was privately educated at Repton School and Sidney Sussex College, Cambridge, where he graduated with a BA degree in History in 1966. At Cambridge, he was rusticated for a year after a night climbing incident in which he had displayed a banner against the Vietnam War between the pinnacles of King's College Chapel. He also has a Diploma in Art and Design from the Chelsea School of Art.

Raynsford was a councillor for the London Borough of Hammersmith and Fulham from 1971 to 1975. Before he was elected to Parliament he was director of the Shelter Housing Aid Centre. He says a major reason he chose to seek parliamentary office was his involvement in campaigning for better provision for the homeless, achieved through the 1977 Homeless Persons Act. The 1977 Act extended local council responsibility "to provide accommodation for homeless people in their area," and instituted the right of homeless families to a permanent local council tenancy.

Political career

Early parliamentary career: 1986–1997 
Raynsford was first elected a member of parliament (MP) for the Labour Party in a by-election in Fulham Constituency in 1986, but at the 1987 General Election lost to Conservative candidate Matthew Carrington. He then became MP for Greenwich at the 1992 general election, and at the 1997 general election he won the re-drawn seat of Greenwich & Woolwich. He retained the seat at the 2001, 2005 and 2010 general elections, with majorities of 13,433, 10,146 and 10,153 respectively.

In opposition, Raynsford was Shadow Minister for Housing and Construction from 1994, and frontbench spokesperson for London from 1993. From 1992 to 1993, he was a member of the Environment Select Committee.

Ministerial career: 1997–2005 
Raynsford joined the government in 1997 and held responsibility for construction, housing, planning and the regions. During this time he was responsible for the implementation of the Decent Homes Standard. In 1997, there were 2.1m houses owned by local authorities and housing associations that didn't meet the Decent Homes Standard. By the end of 2010, 92% of social housing met the standard of being warm and weatherproof with reasonably modern facilities.

As the government minister responsible for construction, Raynsford was credited with introducing building regulations which significantly improved standards, including making mandatory disabled access in new builds, increasing energy efficiency standards and fire safety. His position also included responsibility for the Fire Service and the creation of the London Resilience Forum to oversee London's preparedness for dealing with emergencies (see Operation Sassoon). As a local government minister, he led the Local Government Act 2000 through Parliament, which repealed the controversial Section 28.

As Minister for London from 2001 to 2003, Raynsford was responsible for restoring democratic citywide government to London, and the creation of the Greater London Authority and the commission of its home at City Hall.

Later parliamentary career: 2005–2015 
After the 2005 general election, Raynsford returned to the backbenches. In June 2009, he publicly called for Gordon Brown to resign as Prime Minister, stating at the time, "I personally have considerable respect for Gordon Brown but his leadership is now so seriously damaged that I can't see the likelihood of him leading Labour successfully into the next general election. It's now appropriate for the party to look for a new leader".

On 28 March 2010, The Sunday Times reported that Raynsford earned £9,000 per month from jobs in industries connected to his ministerial career. They focused around three areas of activity – housing, construction and local government – with which Raynsford has been involved throughout his working life.

In opposition again in the 2010–15 Parliament, Raynsford was a consistent critic of the bedroom tax, and in July 2014 co-sponsored the Affordable Homes Bill, which sought to limit the impact of the bedroom tax on tenants in the social rented sector. He also co-chaired a parliamentary inquiry into youth unemployment which encouraged the promotion of apprenticeships in the construction industry.

As a constituency MP, Raynsford promoted regeneration in the Greenwich Borough, including campaigns for the North Greenwich Station on the Jubilee Line, the extension of the DLR to Greenwich and Woolwich, and the campaign to secure a Crossrail Station in Woolwich, and support for bringing the Olympics to his constituency. He also advocated improved river crossings in East and South East London In May 2014, he expressed his opposition to a memorial to murdered soldier Lee Rigby, suggesting it ""would not in my view be helpful" because it "might attract undesirable interest from extremists". Greenwich Council noted they had been "overwhelmed by interest in a local memorial", but also opposed the tribute.

In March 2013, Raynsford announced his intention to stand down as MP for Greenwich and Woolwich at the next general election and cited his age as the reason behind his decision.

Later career 
Raynsford remains involved with UK construction. He is chair of CICAIR Ltd, a wholly-owned subsidiary of the Construction Industry Council. He is a board member of the Construction Industry Council and he chaired the group from 2006 to 2008. The group maintains and operates the Approved Inspectors Register regulating approved inspectors qualified to undertake building control work. Since January 2019, he has been deputy chairman of Crossrail Limited.

Personal life
Raynsford married Anne Jelley in 1968, and they had three daughters. They were divorced in 2011, and he is now the husband of Alison Seabeck, the former Labour MP for Plymouth Moor View. Raynsford's ancestry can be seen in Burke's Landed Gentry.

Notes

References

External links
Nick Raysford official site
Nick Raynsford's Weblog official blog

1945 births
Living people
Labour Party (UK) MPs for English constituencies
Members of the Privy Council of the United Kingdom
Alumni of Sidney Sussex College, Cambridge
UK MPs 1983–1987
UK MPs 1992–1997
UK MPs 1997–2001
UK MPs 2001–2005
UK MPs 2005–2010
People educated at Repton School
UK MPs 2010–2015
People from West Northamptonshire District
Politics of the Royal Borough of Greenwich
Councillors in the London Borough of Hammersmith and Fulham
Labour Party (UK) councillors
Spouses of British politicians